Fernando Camões de Araújo (born 21 February 1997), known as Fernandinho, is a Portuguese professional footballer who plays for Barreirense, as a midfielder.

Football career
On 23 July 2017, Fernandinho made his professional debut with Famalicão in a 2017–18 Taça da Liga match against Santa Clara.

On 25 August 2020, Fernandinho signed for Armenian Premier League club Lori.

References

External links

1997 births
Living people
Portuguese footballers
Association football midfielders
Liga Portugal 2 players
F.C. Famalicão players
Footballers from Lisbon